The Crain Communications Building  is a 39-story, 582 foot (177 m) skyscraper located at 150 North Michigan Avenue in downtown Chicago, Illinois. It was also known as the Smurfit–Stone Building and the Stone Container Building. While the building was originally going to be called "One Park Place," it opened as The Associates Center, named after the initial tenant of the building, the Associates Commercial Corp.

Construction of the building began in 1983 and was completed in 1984. The building, noted for its unusually slanted facade, was designed by Sheldon Schlegman of A. Epstein and Sons.  It has 39 floors of tenant space and the two spires at the top cover the main roof and serve as mechanical rooms for HVAC equipment.

History
Although the building looks as though it is split down the middle, the two sides are only slightly disjointed until nearing the top, where there is a gap between them.  At times, its slanted roof—which has been likened to a skyscraper pared with a knife—displays local sports slogans on its face, such as "GO BEARS" and "GO SOX". It also displayed "VOTE 2008" during the 2008 election day rally at Grant Park.

At the time of its construction, the Associates Center was considered to be a smart building, with sophisticated environmental and security controls. Three years after its completion, the building played a role in the Touchstone Pictures film Adventures in Babysitting. It was also the location of Patrovita's office in the 1986 film Raw Deal. The building is also modeled in EA's SimCity 4, as well as being destroyed in the film Transformers: Dark of the Moon and in the videogame Command & Conquer: Red Alert 2. The building name was changed to the Crain Communications Building in March 2012, after Crain Communications moved its headquarters there.

The building is popularly referred to as the Diamond Building or the Vagina Building (from the locally popular but apocryphal story that, with its prominent vertical slit up the front, the building was designed to be a yonic counter to the phallic nature of most skyscrapers).

Tenants
Crain Communications
 Consulate General of Sweden Chicago
Wells Fargo: Insurance Services
United Airlines: previously maintained a ticketing office in this building.

See also
List of tallest buildings in Chicago

References

External links
 
 

Office buildings completed in 1984
Skyscraper office buildings in Chicago